The Pitjantjatjara (or ) are an Aboriginal people of the Central Australian desert near Uluru. They are closely related to the Yankunytjatjara and Ngaanyatjarra and their languages are, to a large extent, mutually intelligible (all are varieties of the Western Desert language).

They refer to themselves as aṉangu (people). The Pitjantjatjara live mostly in the northwest of South Australia, extending across the border into the Northern Territory to just south of Lake Amadeus, and west a short distance into Western Australia. The land is an inseparable and important part of their identity, and every part of it is rich with stories and meaning to aṉangu.

They have, for the most part, given up their nomadic hunting and gathering lifestyle but have retained their language and much of their culture in synergy with increasing influences from the broader Australian community.

Today there are still about 4,000 aṉangu living scattered in small communities and outstations across their traditional lands, forming one of the most successful joint land arrangements in Australia with Aboriginal traditional owners.

Pronunciation 
The ethnonym Pitjantjatjara is usually pronounced (in normal, fast speech) with elision of one of the repeated syllables -tja-, thus: pitjantjara. In more careful speech all syllables will be pronounced.

Etymology 
The name Pitjantjatjara derives from the word pitjantja, a nominalised form of the verb "go" (equivalent to the English "going" used as a noun). Combined with the comitative suffix -tjara, it means something like "pitjantja-having" (i.e. the variety that uses the word pitjantja for "going"). This distinguishes it from its near neighbour Yankunytjatjara which has yankunytja for the same meaning. This naming strategy is also the source of the names of Ngaanyatjarra and Ngaatjatjarra but in that case the names contrast the two languages based on their words for "this" (respectively, ngaanya and ngaatja). The two languages Pitjantjatjara and Yankunytjatjara may be grouped together under the name Nyangatjatjara (indicating that they have nyangatja for "this") which then contrasts them with Ngaanyatjarra and Ngaatjatjarra.

Language
Pitjantjatjara language is used as a general term for a number of closely related dialects which together, according to Ronald Trudinger were "spoken over a wider area of Australia than any other Aboriginal language". With Yankunytjatjara it shares an 80% overlap in vocabulary.

Some major communities
See WARU community directory for a complete list
 in South Australia type 2
 in the Anangu Pitjantjatjara Yankunytjatjara, including:
 Ernabella also called Pukatja
 Amata
 Kalka
 Pipalyatjara
 Yalata
 Oak Valley
 In the Northern Territory
 Docker River
 Areyonga
 Mutitjulu
 In Western Australia
 Wingellina also called Irruntju

History
A  tract of land was established in the north west of South Australia for the Pitjantjatjara in 1921 after they lost much land due to hostile encroachment by hunters and ranchers.

Extended droughts in the 1920s and between 1956 and 1965 in their traditional lands in the Great Victoria and Gibson deserts led many Pitjantjatjara, and their traditionally more westerly relations, the Ngaanyatjarra, to move east towards the railway between Adelaide and Alice Springs in search of food and water, thus mixing with the most easterly of the three, the Yankunytjatjara. They refer to themselves as aṉangu, which originally just meant people in general, but has now come to imply an Aboriginal person or, more specifically, a member of one of the groups that speaks a variety of the Western Desert Language.

In response to continuing outside pressures on the aṉangu, the Government of South Australia gave its support to a plan by the Presbyterian Church of Australia to set up the Ernabella Mission in the Musgrave Ranges as a safe haven. This mission, largely due to the actions of their advocate, Charles Duguid, was ahead of the times in that there was no systematic attempt to destroy Aboriginal culture, as was common on many other missions.

From 1950 onwards, many aṉangu were forced to leave their traditional lands due to British nuclear tests at Maralinga. Some aṉangu were subsequently contaminated by the nuclear fallout from the atomic tests, and many have died as a consequence. Their experience of issues of land rights and native title in South Australia has been unique.

Recognition of sacred sites 

The sacred sites of Uluru / Ayers Rock and Kata Tjuṯa / Mount Olga possess important spiritual and ceremonial significance for the Anangu with more than 40 named sacred sites and 11 separate Tjukurpa (or "Dreaming") tracks in the area, some of which lead as far as the sea. Uluru / Ayers Rock and Kata Tjuta / Mount Olga are separated from the Pitjantjatjara lands by the border between the Northern Territory and South Australia and have become a major tourist attraction and a national park. The Central Land Council laid claim to the Uluṟu-Kata Tjuṯa National Park and some adjoining vacant Crown land in 1979, but this claim was challenged by the Northern Territory Government.

After years of intensive lobbying by the land council, on 11 November 1983 the prime minister, Bob Hawke, announced that the federal government intended to transfer inalienable freehold title to them. He agreed to ten main points they had demanded in exchange for a lease-back arrangement to the Australian National Parks and Wildlife Service in a "joint-management" régime where Anangu would have a majority on the board of management. This was implemented in 1985, after further negotiations extended the lease period from 50 to 99 years and agreement was reached on the retention of tourists' access to Uluru / Ayers Rock.

The Arrernte land is Aboriginal land in central Australia. It is controlled by the Arrernte Council which in turn is controlled by the Central Land Council from Alice Springs.

Notable people

 Gordon Briscoe, an association football player
 Ian Abdulla, an award-winning author, and artist
 Trevor Adamson, a country/gospel singer
 Anmanari Brown, pioneering artist
 Hector Burton, an artist
 Wawiriya Burton, an artist, known for acrylic works
 Angkaliya Curtis, an artist
 Malpiya Davey, also known as Irpintiri Davey, an artist, known for ceramic artworks
 Jimmy James OAM, a tracker
 Rene Kulitja, an artist, a famous design is Yananyi Dreaming, which covers a Qantas Boeing 737
 David Miller, an artist
 Dickie Minyintiri, an award-winning artist, and sacred lawman
 Tiger Palpatja, an artist
 Walter Pukutiwara, an artist
 Kunmanara Stewart, an artist
 Tjunkaya Tapaya, a batik artist
 Malya Teamay, an Aboriginal Australian artist, and Uluṟu-Kata Tjuṯa National Park management board member
 Wingu Tingima, an artist
 Tony Tjamiwa, also known as Tony Curtis, a traditional healer and storyteller
 Harry Tjutjuna, an artist
 Yannima Tommy Watson, known as Tommy Watson, an artist
 Ginger Wikilyiri, an artist
 Ruby Williamson, an artist, known for acrylic works
 Bart Willoughby, a musician, noted for his pioneering fusion of reggae
 Frank Yamma, an early proponent of singing Western style songs in traditional language
 Isaac Yamma, a country singer
 Harold Allison, initiated as a member of the Pitjantjatjara shortly after becoming Minister of Aboriginal Affairs

See also

 Wiltja, a shelter made by the Pitjantjatjara people and other indigenous Australian groups

Notes

Citations

Sources

 (reprint)

External links
 Ngapartji Online course of Pitjantjatjara language, and related performance event
 Web portal for Anangu Pitjantjatjara, Yankunytjatjara and Ngaanyatjarra peoples, communities and organisations
 Yalata Land Management
 Pitjantjatjara entry in the AusAnthrop database
 Pitjantjatjara People at Agreements, Treaties and Negotiated Settlements (ATNS)

 
Native title in Australia